David Guilherme Muffato (born June 16, 1971 in Cascavel, Paraná) is a Brazilian racing driver. He won the Stock Car Brasil in 2003.

Complete Stock Car Brasil results
(key) (Races in bold indicate pole position) (Races in italics indicate fastest lap)

External links

1971 births
Living people
Brazilian racing drivers
Stock Car Brasil drivers
People from Cascavel
Sportspeople from Paraná (state)